The Madman of Bergerac is a detective novel by Belgian writer Georges Simenon, featuring his character inspector Jules Maigret.

Translations
The book has been translated two times into English: in 1940 by Geoffrey Sainsbury as The Madman of Bergerac, and in 2015 by Ros Schwartz with the same title.

The book is translated into the Georgian language as ბერჟერაკელი მანიაკი, by Nukri Fkhakadze and Giorgi Chikobava.

Adaptations
The novel has been adapted four times for film and television: in French in 1979 as Maigret et le fou de Bergerac, with Jean Richard in the lead role and in 2002 as Maigret et le fou de Saint-Clothilde, with Bruno Cremer in the main role; in Italian in 1972 as Il pazzo di Bergerac, with Gino Cervi and in English in 1962 as The Madman of Vervac, with Rupert Davies in the main role.

Literature
Maurice Piron, Michel Lemoine, L'Univers de Simenon, guide des romans et nouvelles (1931-1972) de Georges Simenon, Presses de la Cité, 1983, p. 284-285

External links

Maigret at trussel.com

References 

1932 Belgian novels
Maigret novels
Novels set in France
Novels set in the 20th century